Heensåsen Church is a parish church of the Church of Norway in Vang Municipality in Innlandet county, Norway. It is located in the village of Hænsgardane. It is the church for the Heensåsen parish which is part of the Valdres prosti (deanery) in the Diocese of Hamar. The white, wooden church was built in a long church design in 1902 using plans drawn up by the architect Johan Meyer. The church seats about 200 people.

History
At the beginning of the 20th century, work began on a new annex chapel at Hænsgardane. Johan Meyer was hired to design the building and Erik Eriksen was hired as the lead builder. The building was consecrated on 17 September 1902. Later it was upgraded from a chapel to parish church status.

See also
List of churches in Hamar

References

Vang, Oppland
Churches in Innlandet
Long churches in Norway
Wooden churches in Norway
20th-century Church of Norway church buildings
Churches completed in 1902
1902 establishments in Norway